"City Boy" is a song by Norwegian pop band Donkeyboy from their second studio album Silver Moon. It was released as the album's lead single on 29 November 2011. The song peaked at number one in Norway and Denmark, becoming their sixth top 10 single.

Track listing 
Digital download 
"City Boy" – 3:25

Charts and certifications

Weekly charts

Certifications

References

2011 singles
Donkeyboy songs
Number-one singles in Denmark
Number-one singles in Norway
2011 songs
Warner Music Group singles
Songs written by Simen Eriksrud
Songs written by Espen Berg (musician)
Songs written by Cato Sundberg